The Duke of Buccleuch's Hunt is a fox hunt which hunts in the Scottish Borders area of Scotland.

History
The Duke of Buccleuch's Hunt was founded in 1827 by Walter Montagu Douglas Scott, 5th Duke of Buccleuch who purchased the pack from George Baillie.

The huntsmen of the Duke of Buccleuch's Hunt have been:
 Will Williamson (1827–63)
 Will Shore (1863–1902)
 George Summers (1902-48)
 Tom Smith (1948–64), kennel huntsman until 1977
 Sir Hugh Arbuthnot (1964–76)
 Captain Simon Clarke (1976–80)
 Lionel Salter (1980–87)
 Tony Mould (1987–89)
 Trevor Adams (1989–2014)
 Tim Allen (2014–present)

The Duke of Buccleuch's Hunt hounds are English Foxhounds, originally Old English Foxhounds were used but more modern lines were introduced from the 1970s.

Hunt country
The hunt's country is the largest in Scotland, covering an area in the counties of Berwickshire, Roxburghshire and Selkirkshire, from west of Hawick to east of Kelso, from the foothills of the Cheviots to the bottom of the Lammermuirs.

During the hunting season, the hunt meets three times a week.

See also
 Fox hunting
 List of foxhound packs of the United Kingdom

References

External links
 Baily’s hunting directory, "Duke of Buccleuch's Hunt", www.bailyshuntingdirectory.com, retrieved 15 October 2018.

Fox hunts in the United Kingdom
Fox hunts in Scotland